Lonely Road is the seventh solo album by Denny Laine.

Track listing
All tracks composed by Denny Laine, except where indicated.

 "Land of Peace" 3.41
 "Eyes of a Child" 3.56
 "Success" 2.59
 "First Day in London" 3.46
 "Lonely Road" 2.45
 "True to Me" 3.41
 "Without Your Love" (Eddie Hardin) 3.01
 "If I Tried" 2.25
 "Burnin' Bridges" 2.57
 "Money Talks" 3.41
 "What Can I Do Without You" 2.54
 "Fly With the Dove" 4.09
 "Black Sheep" 3.41
 "Peace Must Come Again" (Hardin) 4.01

Personnel
Denny Laine: Guitar & Vocals

Production notes
Produced by Denny Laine and John Burns
Engineered by Ike Nossel and Ray Fenwick

1988 albums
Denny Laine albums